Charles Morris (8 June 1711 – buried 4 November 1781) army officer, served on the Nova Scotia Council, Chief Justice of the Nova Scotia Supreme Court (1776–1778) and, the surveyor general for over 32 years, he created some of the first British maps of Canada's maritime region and designed the layout of Halifax, Lunenburg, Lawrencetown, and Liverpool.  In Halifax he laid out both the present-day down town core and the Halifax Common.

History 
He was born in Boston and when he first came to the colony he fought in the Battle of Grand Pré. The maps he produced  and information he gathered about the disposition of Acadians villages during his surveying of the colony was later used by the Military authority in Halifax to initiate the Expulsion of the Acadians during the French and Indian War.

He was named to the Council 30 December 1755, and did not directly participate in the expulsion decision that July.

He fought for and won the establishment of the Nova Scotia House of Assembly (1758). Morris was instrumental in establishing New England Planters in the colony.

As chief justice, his most famous trial was of those who participated in the Eddy Rebellion (1776) at the outbreak of the American Revolution.

Publications 

(originally printed as a four page pamphlet)

Legacy 
 namesake of Morris Street, Halifax
 namesake of Fort Morris (Nova Scotia)
 Morris House (Halifax) which his son purchased and where he lived is the oldest wooden residence in Halifax

See also 
Military history of Nova Scotia
List of cartographers

References
Endnotes

Texts

1711 births
1781 deaths
British emigrants to pre-Confederation Nova Scotia
Politicians from Boston
Colony of Nova Scotia judges